Don S. Wenger (December 18, 1911 – July 10, 1986) was a major general in the United States Air Force.

Biography
Wenger was born in Monroe, Wisconsin, in 1911. He attended Milton College, the University of Wisconsin-Madison, the Marquette University School of Medicine, the St. Mary's University School of Law, and George Washington University. As a civilian he practiced medicine in Milwaukee, Wisconsin. Wenger died on July 10, 1986.

Career
Wenger joined the military in 1942. During World War II he served in Germany. He became a resident in surgery at Oliver General Hospital in Augusta, Georgia in 1947. In 1949 he was assigned to Chanute Air Force Base. From 1953 to 1957 he was assigned to the Office of the Surgeon General of the United States Air Force. In 1957 he was assigned to Lackland Air Force Base as Chairman of the Department of Surgery. Later Wenger was reassigned to the Office of the Surgeon General as Chief Professional Consultant. His retirement was effective as of July 1, 1967.

References

People from Monroe, Wisconsin
Military personnel from Wisconsin
Physicians from Wisconsin
United States Air Force generals
United States Army Air Forces personnel of World War II
United States Air Force Medical Corps officers
Milton College alumni
University of Wisconsin–Madison alumni
Marquette University alumni
St. Mary's University, Texas alumni
St. Mary's University School of Law alumni
George Washington University alumni
1986 deaths
1911 births
Medical College of Wisconsin alumni